The Book of Colour is a novel by British author Julia Blackburn, published in 1995 by Pantheon Books. Blackburn's first novel, the book was praised by critics and shortlisted for the Women's Prize for Fiction.

Background
The Book of Colour was the first novel by Blackburn, a writer previously best-known for her biographies. Blackburn stated the novel was based on her own family history.

Summary
The narrative begins with a missionary on a 19th-century island in the Indian Ocean. His actions form the basis for the remainder of the story which follows his descendants. The novel explores themes of racial intolerance and guilt.

Reception
The Book of Colour was mostly well-received by critics. Writing in the New York Times, Michiko Kakutani called the book "a dense, poetic tale of a family's inheritance." Kirkus Reviews said the book was a "first novel of beauty and accomplishment". Publishers Weekly offered a mixed review, describing the novel's central question as "dishearteningly rhetorical".

Awards
The Book of Colour was shortlisted for the inaugural Women's Prize for Fiction in 1996.

References

1995 American novels
Pantheon Books books